The Europe Zone was the unique zone within Group 3 of the regional Davis Cup competition in 2021. The zone's competition was held in round robin format in Larnaca, Cyprus, from 16 to 19 June 2021.

Participating nations

Withdrawn nations

Draw
Date: 16–19 June 2021

Location: Herodotou Tennis Academy, Larnaca, Cyprus (hard)

Format: Round-robin basis. Two pools – one of four teams and one of three teams – and nations will play each team once in their group. The two group winners will automatically earn promotion to the World Group II play-offs in 2022.

The two second-placed teams will fight for the third remaining promotion spot. The two teams finishing in third place will fight to avoid relegation to Europe Group IV and the team finishing fourth place in the pool of four teams will automatically be relegated.

Seeding

 1Davis Cup Rankings as of 8 March 2021

Round Robin

Pool A

Pool B

Standings are determined by: 1. number of wins; 2. number of matches; 3. in two-team ties, head-to-head records; 4. in three-team ties, (a) percentage of sets won (head-to-head records if two teams remain tied), then (b) percentage of games won (head-to-head records if two teams remain tied), then (c) Davis Cup rankings.

Playoffs

Round Robin

Pool A

Georgia vs. Iceland

Cyprus vs. Iceland

Georgia vs. Cyprus

Pool B

Monaco vs. Malta

Luxembourg vs. Ireland

Monaco vs. Ireland

Luxembourg vs. Malta

Monaco vs. Luxembourg

Ireland vs. Malta

Play-offs

Promotional play-offs

Cyprus vs. Monaco

Georgia vs. Ireland

Relegation play-offs

Iceland vs. Luxembourg

Final placements 

References

External links
Official Website

Davis Cup Europe/Africa Zone
Europe Zone